Bougy is a commune in Calvados, France.

Bougy may also refer to:

Places
Bougy-lez-Neuville, commune in Loire, France
Bougy-Villars, municipality in Vaud, Switzerland
Alfred de Bougy (1815-1874), French poet

See also
 Bogy (disambiguation)
 Bougie (disambiguation)
 Buggy (disambiguation)